Italian Bolivians are Bolivians citizens of Italian descent. The term may also refer to someone who has immigrated to Bolivia from Italy.

History
A few dozen Italians moved to Bolivia before the wars of independence made by Simón Bolívar. From the beginning of the 19th century, a few hundred Italians arrived in the country from northern Chile, working in the construction of railways, and some settled in the region of La Paz, to set up commercial enterprises especially in the textile and food sector.

In 1876 a descendant of Italians originating from Piedmont, Hilarion Daza Groselle, was president of Bolivia.

In 1889 - according to the Italian Consulate - about 400 Italians lived in Bolivia, distributed as follows: 40 Italians in La Paz, 20 in Oruro, 29 in Cochabamba, 31 in Sucre, 44 in the hot lands of Santa Cruz, 38 in Tarija and 16 in Potosí, over another hundred in other localities, for a total of between 300 and 350 people.

In the early years of the 20th century, a considerable number of Italians in Bolivia were engaged in commercial activities, but there were also some professionals (architects, engineers, doctors, etc.) and several religious. It should be noted that in 1910 the Società Italiana di Beneficenza Roma ("Italian Charity Society Rome") was founded to help the poor Italians, and in 1934 Casa Italia was created in La Paz as the main meeting place for the small community.

After various vicissitudes related to the two world wars, the Italian citizens has stabilized at around 2/3,000 units and is concentrated in the metropolitan areas of La Paz, Sucre, Santa Cruz and Cochabamba. All are perfectly integrated into Bolivian society, where many have reached the highest levels. In addition, there are some Italian associations, such as the Circolo culturale italiano ("Italian cultural circle") of La Paz and that of Santa Cruz.

In 2010, there were over 15,000 Bolivians of Italian descent, while there were around 2,700 Italian citizens. One of the most famous Bolivians of Italian ancestry is the writer and poet Óscar Cerruto, considered one of the great authors of Bolivian literature.

See also
 Italian diaspora
 Bolivia-Italy relations
 Immigration to Bolivia

References

Bibliography
Belmonte Pijuán, Mauricio. Polenta.Familias Italianas en Bolivia. Editor Rolando Diez de Medina. La Paz, 2011 (in Spanish).
Guarnieri Carducci, Luigi. L'emigrazione italiana in Bolivia dall'Unità alla fine del XX secolo: periodizzazione e caratteristiche. Università di Teramo. Teramo, 2003 (in Italian).

Ethnic groups in Bolivia
European Bolivian
 
Bolivia
Bolivians